Bapir Vali Allah (also Romanized as Bāpīr Valī Āllah; also known as Posht Tang-e Vosţá) is a village in Tarhan-e Sharqi Rural District, Tarhan District, Kuhdasht County, Lorestan Province, Iran. At the 2006 census, its population was 566, in 112 families.

References 

Towns and villages in Kuhdasht County